David Cedric Morris (11 September 1924 – 29 October 2007) was an English painter and actor, perhaps best known for his role as Grandpa George in Charlie and the Chocolate Factory (2005). He made his debut as a professional actor at the age of 79.

Life and career

Morris was born in Folkestone, Kent. He won a choral scholarship to Magdalen College School, Oxford, at the age of nine. He went on to read English at Magdalen College at the University of Oxford. His tutor was C. S. Lewis.

During World War II, his brother was killed in North Africa. That and his own experiences serving in the war led Morris to become a peace activist. He later became an active member of the Campaign for Nuclear Disarmament and helped organize the first Artists for Peace exhibition in the 1980s.

After the war, Morris decided to become an artist, and he studied at the École des Beaux-Arts. Some of his portraits and landscapes were exhibited by the Royal Society of Portrait Painters and the Royal Academy, and two of his murals depicting views from Waterloo Bridge are displayed at St. John's Church, Waterloo Road, London. He taught art for 20 years in the Royal Academy Schools and lectured at various other schools in London, Oxford and Brighton.

Morris was an amateur actor who staged Shakespeare productions in a converted barn called the "Bottom Theatre" at his home in Roughwood, Buckinghamshire. In 2004, he was recommended for a role in the TV mystery series Jonathan Creek by his friend, director Sandy Johnson. He went on to appear in the TV movie When I'm 64 and the comedy series Little Britain and Saxondale. In 2005, he played Grandpa George in Tim Burton's Charlie and the Chocolate Factory.

He married Olwen Goodwin, a pianist, in 1957 and they had four children: Sarah, Martin, Stephen and Anna. Morris died on 29 October 2007 from a heart attack, aged 83.

Filmography

References

External links
 

1924 births
2007 deaths
English male actors
British Army personnel of World War II
People educated at Magdalen College School, Oxford
Alumni of Magdalen College, Oxford
20th-century English painters
English male painters
20th-century English male artists